Pokiri Raja  is a 1995 Indian Telugu-language action film, produced by A. Venkat Rami Reddy under L V S Productions and directed by A. Kodandarami Reddy. It stars Venkatesh, Roja, Pratibha Sinha, Ali with music by Raj–Koti. Venkatesh played a double role in the film. It was a remake of the Hindi film Aankhen  which was inspired from Kannada film Kittu Puttu  which itself was based on Tamil film Anubavi Raja Anubavi. The film was Average at the box office.

Plot
The story begins with the arrest of international stock market broker Ashok Kumar (K. Ashok Kumar), who has cheated the public of 2000 crores, the court decides to keep him under the supervision of Chief Minister (Sarath Babu). A mafia gang leader Vicky (Mohan Raj) plans to help Ashok Kumar escape from jail, by doing plastic surgery on his younger brother Bhadram (again Sarath Babu), to look like the CM.

Simultaneously, a rich industrialist Ananda Rao Naidu (Satyanarayana) is always having problems with his mischievous son Chanti (Venkatesh) and nephew Nani (Ali). The two are notorious slackers, always up to no good, and involved in elaborate practical jokes, they fall in love with Prathiba (Pratibha Sinha) and Nikita (Subhashri). It comes to Ananda Rao's attention that his son and nephew have been lying to him about their college grades in studies and sports. As a result, they are kicked out of college and ultimately from their home.

Later, they protect the CM's son from an accident and the CM invites them for coffee, at the same time Vicky plans an attack on the CM in which his wife and son die and the CM is injured. Chanti and Nani follow them and come to know everything regarding their plan, in the attack Nani escapes, but Chanti disappears, presumed dead, Nani gets involved with a conspiracy to kill Chanti and he is arrested. At the same time, the gangsters change CM from the hospital and replace him with their duplicate.

Meanwhile, in a small Indian village, Narasimha (again Satyanarayana), twin brother of Ananda Rao Naidu, who was separated in childhood, his son Balaraju (again Venkatesh) Chanti's identical cousin arrives in town with his fiancée Chandra Mukhi (Roja). At the same time, Chanti is also found alive, and both of them get exchanged which leads to hilarious misunderstandings and the remaining story is about who protects the CM in the climax.

Cast

 Venkatesh as Chanti & Balaraju (Dual role)
 Roja as Chandramukhi (Voice dubbed by Roja Ramani )
 Pratibha Sinha as Pratibha (Voice dubbed by Shilpa)
 Ali as Nani
 Satyanarayana as Ananda Rao Naidu & Narasimha (Dual role)
 Brahmanandam as Raja
 Sarath Babu as CM & Brahmam (Dual role)
 Tanikella Bharani as Inspector Prem Chand
 Mohan Raj as Vicky
 K. Ashok Kumar as Ashok Kumar
 Chalapathi Rao as DCP
 Maharshi Raghava as Ashok Kumar's brother
 Vidyasagar as Security officer
Chitti Babu as Lecturer
Gundu Hanumantha Rao as Thief
 Ananth Babu as Thief
 Chitti Babu as Lecturer
 Gautam Raju
 Sarathi as Principal
 K. K. Sharma
 Kallu Chidambaram as Thief
 Ironleg Sastri as Raja's father
 Jenny as Lecturer
 Subhashri as Nikitha
 Sudha as CM's wife
 Jyothi Lakshmi as Kanya Kumari
 Radha Kumari as Ananda Naidu's sister
 Vichithra as Chitra
 Telangana Shakuntala as Ramulamma

Soundtrack

Soundtrack was composed by Raj–Koti

References

External links
 

1995 films
Films directed by A. Kodandarami Reddy
1990s Telugu-language films
Telugu remakes of Hindi films
Films about twin brothers
Indian comedy-drama films
1995 comedy-drama films
Films scored by Raj–Koti
Films shot in Hyderabad, India
Films set in Hyderabad, India